In mathematics, the Al-Salam–Chihara polynomials Qn(x;a,b;q) are a family of basic hypergeometric orthogonal polynomials in the basic Askey scheme, introduced by .  give a detailed list of the properties of Al-Salam–Chihara polynomials.

Definition

The Al-Salam–Chihara polynomials are given in terms of basic hypergeometric functions and the q-Pochhammer symbol by 

where x = cos(θ).

References

Further reading
 Bryc, W., Matysiak, W., & Szabłowski, P. (2005). Probabilistic aspects of Al-Salam–Chihara polynomials. Proceedings of the American Mathematical Society, 133(4), 1127-1134.
 Floreanini, R., LeTourneux, J., & Vinet, L. (1997). Symmetry techniques for the Al-Salam-Chihara polynomials. Journal of Physics A: Mathematical and General, 30(9), 3107.
 Christiansen, J. S., & Koelink, E. (2008). Self-adjoint difference operators and symmetric Al-Salam–Chihara polynomials. Constructive Approximation, 28(2), 199-218.
 Ishikawa, M., & Zeng, J. (2009). The Andrews–Stanley partition function and Al-Salam–Chihara polynomials. Discrete Mathematics, 309(1), 151-175.
 Atakishiyeva, M. K., & Atakishiyev, N. M. (1997). Fourier-Gauss transforms of the Al-Salam-Chihara polynomials. Journal of Physics A: Mathematical and General, 30(19), L655.

Orthogonal polynomials
Q-analogs
Special hypergeometric functions